Subbing may refer to:
 Sub-editing
 Submission (BDSM)
 Subsidy (informal, where one person pays in part or full for another person)
 Substitution (disambiguation)
 Subtitling
 Subway (restaurant)
 Subscribing to a user on YouTube